Yevgenia Savranska (or Yevgenia Savransky, Hebrew: יבגניה סברנסקי; born 20 February 1984) is a retired Israeli-Ukrainian tennis player.

Career
On 17 July 2006, she reached her highest WTA singles ranking of 172 whilst her best doubles ranking was 191, on 10 July 2006. She won eight singles and eleven doubles titles on the ITF Circuit in her career.

Playing for Israel Fed Cup team, Savranska has a win–loss record of 0–1.

She made her WTA Tour doubles main-draw debut at the 2008 Internationaux de Strasbourg, partnering Mihaela Buzărnescu.

Savranska made her WTA Tour singles debut at the 2009 Barcelona Ladies Open, defeating Lucie Hradecká, Gréta Arn and Émilie Loit in the qualifying tournament for a place in the main draw. However, she was defeated in the first round by former world No. 7, Nicole Vaidišová, 6–2, 6–4.

Savranska received Ukrainian citizenship in July 2007. She retired from professional tennis in November 2015.

ITF Circuit finals

Singles: 17 (8 titles, 9 runner-ups)

Doubles (11 titles, 15 runner-ups)

Fed Cup participation

Doubles

References

External links
 
 

1984 births
Living people
Ukrainian female tennis players
Israeli female tennis players
Ukrainian twins
Twin sportspeople
Israeli people of Ukrainian descent